Lomba is a surname. Notable people with the surname include:

 Hermann Lomba (born 1960), French sprinter
 Jimmy Lomba (born 1978), French middle-distance runner
 Marcelo Lomba (born 1986), Brazilian football goalkeeper
 Marisabel Lomba (born 1974), Belgian judoka and Olympic bronze medalist